CAR-302,282 (302282, NSC-263548, α-(3-Methylbut-1-yn-3-enyl)mandelic acid 1-methyl-4-piperidyl ester) is an anticholinergic deliriant drug, invented under contract to Edgewood Arsenal in the 1960s. It is a potent incapacitating agent with an ED50 of 1.2μg/kg and a high central to peripheral effects ratio, and a relatively short duration of action compared to other similar drugs of around 6-10 hours. Despite its favorable properties it was relatively little researched compared to more high profile compounds from the series such as EA-3167 and EA-3580.

See also 
 CAR-226,086
 CAR-301,060
 CAR-302,196

References 

Deliriants
Muscarinic antagonists
Incapacitating agents
Piperidines
Carboxylate esters
Alkyne derivatives
Tertiary alcohols